The Pleasures of the Enchanted Island (French: Les Plaisirs de l’Île enchantée) was a multi-day performance presented from 7 to 13 May 1664 to the court of King Louis XIV of France at Versailles. At the king's request, it was organized by the Duke of Saint-Aignan, who took the title from a popular episode in cantos 6–8 and 10 of the 1516 Italian epic Orlando furioso by Ludovico Ariosto, in which the knight Ruggiero (in French, Roger) becomes a prisoner of love at the sorceress Alcina's court.

It was staged to celebrate the beginning of the building campaigns for the Chateau de Versailles with the intention to acquaint those involved in its construction—the King's wife, mother, lovers, mistresses, and family in general—with cotillon style ball and overall culture. In addition, there were about 600 invited guests.

Molière played a large role in the organisation of festivities, which featured the premières of La Princesse d'Élide and Tartuffe.

References

External links
 Les Plaisirs de l'îsle enchantée at Gallica

Ancien Régime
Versailles